Rolf Martin Theodor Dahlgren (7 July 1932 – 14 February 1987) was a Swedish-Danish botanist and professor at the University of Copenhagen from 1973 to his death.

Life 
Dahlgren was born in Örebro on 7 July 1932 to apothecary Rudolf Dahlgren and wife Greta née Dahlstrand. He took his MSc degree in Biology in (1955) and PhD degree in Botany in (1963) at Lund University. He was killed in a car crash in Scania, Sweden on 14 February 1987.

Career 
He continued working on South African plants during expeditions in 1956-57 and 1965–66, while affiliated with the Botanical Museum in Lund as docent. In 1973, he became professor of botany at the University of Copenhagen. Here, he developed his system of Angiosperm classification, based on many more characters simultaneously than previous systems, most notably many chemical plant traits (see also chemotaxonomy). Although the system was first presented in Danish, it rapidly gained widespread acceptance, particularly due to the instructive diagrams, so-called Dahlgrenograms. His work on family circumscription in the Monocotyledons, published with Harold Trevor Clifford and Peter Frederick Yeo, has had profound influence well into the molecular age.

A Rolf Dahlgren Memorial Symposium was held in Berlin, Germany later in 1987. The couple had three children, Susanna, Helena and Fredrik.

In 1986, he was elected member of Royal Swedish Academy of Sciences. The South African monotypic plant genus Dahlgrenodendron (J.H. Ross) J.J.M. van der Merwe & A.E. van Wyk was named to him honour in 1988

List of selected publications 

 
 
 
 Dahlgren R. (1975b). The distribution of characters within an angiosperm system. I. Some embryological characters. Botaniska Notiser  128: 181–197
  in 
 Dahlgren, R., 1977b. A note on the Taxonomy of the 'Synpetalae' and related groups. Publications of the Cairo University Herbarium, 7–8: 83- 102.
 Dahlgren. R., Nielsen, B. J., Goldblait, P. & Rourke, J. P., 1979. Further notes on Retziaceae, its chemical contents and affinities. Annals of the Missouri Botanical Garden, 66: 545-556
 Dahlgren, R., Jensen, S. R., & Nielsen, B. J., 1976. Iridoid compounds in Fouquieraceae and notes on its possible affinities. Bolaniska Notiser 129: 207-212.
 
 
 Dahlgren R.(1983). "General Aspects of Angiosperm Evolution and Macrosystematics". Nordic Journal of Botany 3: 119-149
 
  Additional excerpts

See also
Dahlgren system
Chemotaxonomy

References

Citations

Sources

External links
Example Dahlgrenogram
Portrait photo (Rolf Dahlgren is the person to the right)

20th-century Danish botanists
20th-century Swedish botanists
Members of the Royal Swedish Academy of Sciences
1932 births
1987 deaths
Lund University alumni
Academic staff of the University of Copenhagen